is a small island in the Inland Sea of Japan.  It is considered to be part of the city of Takehara, Hiroshima Prefecture. It is accessible by ferry from Tadanoumi and Ōmishima. There are campsites, walking trails and places of historical interest on the island. It is often called  because of the numerous rabbits that roam the island.  The rabbits are rather tame and will approach humans.

Ōkunoshima played a key role during World War II as a poison gas factory for much of the chemical warfare that was carried out in China.

History

The island was a cultivated area until the Russo-Japanese War when ten forts were built to protect it. Three fishing families lived on the island.

In 1925, the Imperial Japanese Army Institute of Science and Technology initiated a secret program to develop chemical weapons, based on extensive research that showed that chemical weapons were being produced throughout the United States and Europe.  A chemical munitions plant was built on the island between 1927 and 1929 and was home to a chemical weapons facility that would go on to produce over six kilotons of mustard gas and tear gas.

Japan was a signatory of the 1925 Geneva Protocol, which banned the use of chemical warfare but not the development and storage of chemical weapons.  Nevertheless, Japan went to great lengths to keep the chemical munitions plant a secret, even going so far as to remove records of the island from some maps.  The island was chosen for its isolation, security, and distance from Tokyo and other areas in case of disaster. Under the jurisdiction of the Japanese military, the local fish preservation processor was converted into a toxic gas reactor. Residents and potential employees were not told what the plant was manufacturing, and everything was kept secret.  Working conditions were harsh and many suffered from toxic-exposure related illnesses due to inadequate safety equipment.

When World War II ended, documents concerning the plant were burned and Allied Occupation Forces disposed of the gas either by dumping, burning, or burying it. People were told to be silent about the project, and several decades would pass before victims from the plant were given government aid for treatment. In 1988, the Ōkunoshima Poison Gas Museum was opened.

Present day

This island is presently inhabited by a large population of rabbits.  Many of them are descended from rabbits intentionally let loose when the island was developed as a park after World War II. During the war, rabbits were also used in the chemical munitions plant and were used for testing the effectiveness of the chemical weapons, but those rabbits were euthanized or killed when the factory was demolished and are not related to the rabbits currently on the island. Hunting the rabbits is forbidden, and dogs and cats are not allowed on the island.  In 2015, the BBC presented a short television series called Pets – Wild at Heart about the behaviours of pets which featured the rabbits on the island. The series also showed tourists coming to feed the rabbits.

The ruins of the old forts and the gas factory still exist all over the island, but entry is prohibited as it is too dangerous. Since it is part of the Inland Sea National Park system of Japan, there is a resource center and a museum.

Poison Gas Museum

The Poison Gas Museum was opened in 1988 and "was established in order to alert as many people as possible to the dreadful truths about poison gas."  As expressed by its curator, Murakami Hatsuichi, to The New York Times, "My hope is that people will see the museum in Hiroshima City and also this one, so they will learn that we [Japanese] were both victims and aggressors in the war. I hope people will realize both facets and recognize the importance of peace."

The small museum is only two rooms large and provides a basic overview of the construction of the chemical plant, working conditions, and the effects of poison gas on humans. Families of workers who suffered the aftereffects of the harsh working conditions donated numerous artifacts to help tell the story of the workers' plight.  The second room shows how poison gas affects the human body through the lungs, eyes, skin, and heart. Images of victims from Iraq and Iran add to the message of the museum.

The museum also offers guides to the numerous remains of the forts from the Second Sino-Japanese War and the poison gas factory. Most of the buildings are run-down and condemned, but still recognizable.

The museum is aimed primarily at Japanese tourists, but English translations are provided on the overall summary for each section.

Other buildings and structures 

The island is connected to Takehara on the mainland by Chūshi Powerline Crossing, the tallest powerline in Japan.

Travel

Access to Ōkunoshima from mainland Japan is via the  train to Mihara Station (only the  stops there). Habu Shosen now also runs direct ferries from Mihara Port to Ōkunoshima on weekends.

See also
Tashirojima, Japan, also known as Cat Island due to a high population of cats
Aoshima, Ehime, cat island

References

External links
 
Up-to-date information on getting to Rabbit Island
Rabbit Island Kyukamura Ohkunoshima
Paper from Dr. Yukutake on poison gas usage and treatment
Documentary film about Ōkunoshima and Japan's poison gas history

Imperial Japanese Army
Chemical warfare facilities
Islands of Hiroshima Prefecture
Islands of the Seto Inland Sea